Jean Dawson (born December 22, 1995) is a Mexican-American experimental pop musician. Since 2018, he has released three albums and over a dozen singles via his own record label P+, and toured across the US and Europe with artists such as Brockhampton.

Early life
Dawson, whose real name is David Sanders, was born on December 22, 1995 in San Diego, California and grew up in Tijuana, Mexico and Spring Valley, California. He is of mixed heritage, with an African-American father from Long Beach, California and a Mexican mother from Sinaloa. His mother learned English by listening to West Coast hip hop. He would cross the border to San Diego often since he went to elementary school there. He would spend those long bus rides listening to a wide variety of music, including grunge, hip hop, Britpop, new wave, and rock en español. In an interview with MTV's Patrick Hosken, Dawson described himself in school as having never been "the popular kid in school", instead "the kid in the library with one friend. And we'd sit, we'd talk every day about the internet and what we saw on the internet."

Dawson grew up in a musical family, with his parents' interest in each other's culture having been what connected them. This led him to deciding he wanted to make a career out of music at age 13. Growing up in poverty meant he couldn't afford his own instruments, so he would take the bus to a local Guitar Center every day after school and practice piano there.

Career
After finishing high school, Dawson moved to Los Angeles to study film at California State University, Los Angeles. He would buy studio equipment for the money that he was given to buy books, which led to him dropping out to pursue a career in music. While still in college, he would record Bad Sports in his dorm room with his roommate, Lecx Stacy. Essence interviewer Sydney Scott notes the project's influences as including "sonic and visual nods to Outkast, the Cure, Kid Cudi, and Kanye West with the singer-songwriter's taste later being informed by groups like Disturbed, N.E.R.D. and random CDs purchased from thrift stores." The album had a vinyl run, with Dawson later finding a collection of unsold vinyls which he autographed and listed for sale at US$1000, being met with criticism from fans for the high price.

On October 23, 2020, he released his second studio album, Pixel Bath via his independent record label P+.

On June 8, 2021, Dawson was announced as a support act for headliner Brockhampton's US and Europe tour that ran from August 2021 through June 2022. On June 16, Dawson released the Apple Music-exclusive single "Ghost", as part of the music streamer's Juneteenth-inspired Freedom Songs series. Dawson described the song as being "for the people who've felt unseen and unheard", and explained his personal perspective on the holiday, saying it "should never have needed to exist. My ancestors should have never been slaves and built a country that would show to be a curse to my Black skin. Nevertheless, I live in this version of reality where Black folk were and are seen as beasts, devils, and animals. So the day my beautiful Black ancestors were freed is the greatest cause for celebration and reflection." "Ghost" was released on all streaming platforms on February 17, 2023. The music video for Pixel Bath track "Dummy" was also released June 8, 2021, directed by Mowgly Lee and Bradley J. Calder.

In April 2022, Dawson performed at the 2022 Coachella Festival. On August 19, he announced his third studio album, Chaos Now and released lead single "Three Heads". Chaos Now released October 7, via P+. Also on August 19, he announced his first headlining US tour for October and November, supported by LA-based duo Junior Varsity. The tour completely sold out, and left Dawson feeling "like I made thousands of friends in the span of a month." Reviews of the tour were positive, highlighting Dawson's stage presence and the audience's polite but high-energy moshing.

Other ventures 
In 2021, Dawson launched his clothing and merchandise label Turbo Radio, including collections of face masks, shirts, sweatpants, crew necks, and sweaters that he designed.

On February 25, 2021, Dawson released a seven minute documentary short about himself titled Burnout, which he directed himself. The film, featuring "Blade Runner-esque" visual effects and a music score by frequent collaborator Zach Fogarty, sees him discussing his personal life in an intimate, vulnerable way. Topics include his past, being "anti", and getting happier as he gets older.

Style 
In an interview with DIYs Elly Watson, Dawson listed his influences as including Kanye West; The Smashing Pumpkins; "Warped Tour shit"; "anything from Manchester" such as the Smiths; New Order; and "all the stuff that felt really Britpop-py", noting that when working on Bad Sports single "Napster" he asked his British producers Hoskins to make the song "feel like Manchester and Compton had a baby", "like if Morrissey was Black." Dawson described his intent for  Pixel Bath to sound like "Rick Ross at a '90s rave" or "the Pixies, but the Pixies are at the most trapped-out environment that the Pixies can be at."

Dawson has been described as a "genre-shattering polymath" with an "ability to blend [genres which] comes more naturally than most", having employed a long list of sounds including early 2000s indie rock, trap, R&B, bedroom pop, pop-punk, industrial hip hop, glitch-pop, grunge, shoegaze, alternative rock, hardcore hip hop, underground hip hop, emo, country, and classical. Dawson is also commonly referred to as simply an experimental pop artist. Dawson describes his approach by saying "When people ask me what genre I make, I'm like, dude, I don't know" and "What genre of music did Prince make? I'm not comparing myself to Prince—he is a god among humans. But his music was just Prince. It was everything you needed it to be at the time."

Dawson's lyrics cover topics including anxiety, depression, feeling like an outsider, fragile masculinity, drug addiction, gang life, spirituality, and morality.

Personal life 
Dawson has three dogs: a Dobermann named Midnight, a French bulldog named Mala, and an English bulldog named Oz. He lives in Inglewood, California.

Discography
 Bad Sports (2019)
 Pixel Bath (2020)
 Chaos Now (2022)

Singles

Notes

References 

Living people
1995 births
21st-century African-American male singers
African-American male guitarists
African-American pianists
Mexican pop singers
Mexican pianists
Mexican male guitarists
Musicians from San Diego
Singers from Tijuana
People from Spring Valley, San Diego County, California
Musicians from Inglewood, California
California State University, Los Angeles alumni
Experimental pop musicians